John W. Flannagan Dam is a flood control dam located in the Cumberland Mountains of Dickenson County, Virginia. It forms the John W. Flannagan Reservoir behind it.  It was named after Congressman John Williams Flannagan, Jr.

History
Authorized by Congress in the Flood Control Act of 1938, and the Federal Water Pollution Control Act Amendments of 1961, John W. Flannagan Dam and Reservoir is a part of the Big Sandy flood protection system. The U.S. Army Corps of Engineers designed and supervised construction of the dam and now operates it for public benefits.

Construction
Construction of the dam, spillway, and outlet works began in 1960, and was completed by 1964. The earth-filled dam is constructed of rock with a central clay core, which prevents water from passing through the dam. A  lake is formed behind the dam with almost  of shoreline. South of the dam is the emergency spillway. The spillway contains six  gates used to control high water and prevent the lake from flowing over the top of the dam. The outlet works consist of an intake structure and an outlet tunnel. The -high intake structure is located north of the dam, and contains  gates which control the amount of water released into Russell Fork River.

General information
During the fall, the lake is lowered  to hold additional water from winter and spring runoff. When flooding occurs, the gates in the intake structure are closed to the minimum level. The water, which runs off from the  drainage basin behind the dam, is stored in the reservoir to protect life and property downstream. When the danger of downstream flooding has passed, the intake structure gates are opened to lower the reservoir. Opening the gates is coordinated with other dams on the Big Sandy River and Ohio Rivers as a part of a larger flood control system. The dam has prevented millions of dollars of damage in excess of the $20 million it cost to build.

Restrooms are located at the Project Office, Below Dam Area, Junction Area, Cranesnest Area #1, and #3, Lower Twin Area, Spillway Area, and Pound River Area. During the first four full weekends in October Flannagan has whitewater releases to achieve winter pool. From the dam, the first two miles (3 km) are class II rapids which progresses downstream reaching Class V + rapids. Some of the most challenging rapids in the eastern U.S. can be found while traveling through Breaks Interstate Park with names like 20 Stitches, Broken Nose and Triple Drop.

John W. Flannagan Boat Dock (marina) is located at the Junction Area and provides visitors with docking facilities, a gas station, fishing supplies, and a snack bar.

See also
North Fork Pound Reservoir
Pound River

References

Protected areas of Dickenson County, Virginia
Dams in Virginia
Reservoirs in Virginia
United States Army Corps of Engineers, Huntington District
Buildings and structures in Dickenson County, Virginia
United States Army Corps of Engineers dams
Dams completed in 1978
Bodies of water of Dickenson County, Virginia